Regis Emmanuel Roland "Rollie" Paulhus (September 1, 1901 – December 30, 1964) was a Canadian professional ice hockey defenceman who played 33 games in the National Hockey League for the Montreal Canadiens. He was born in Sorel, Quebec and died in 1964 of a heart attack.

References

External links

1901 births
1964 deaths
Canadian ice hockey defencemen
Ice hockey people from Quebec
Montreal Canadiens players
Sportspeople from Sorel-Tracy